Yasmin, also spelled as Yasmeen, is a Pakistani actress known for her work in Pakistani cinema. Her career spanned over two decades during which she appeared as a leading lady as well as supporting roles in the films of Golden Age of Pakistani cinema. She retired from acting after her marriage with Shaukat Hussain Rizvi.

Personal life 

Yasmin was born as Zarina in Bombay, British India in 1935. She was educated there. She first married Jaffar Shah Bokhari. After her divorce with Bokhari, she married director Shaukat Hussain Rizvi, who was the former husband of Noor Jehan.

Career 

Yasmeen made her debut in 1949 with A.R. Kardar's Dillagi in a recurring role. After partition, she shifted to Pakistan and started working in Pakistani cinema. Her debut film in Pakistan was Beli which was released in 1950, followed by Chaan Way (1952), Dupatta (1952), Lakht-e-Jigar (1956) and Morni (1956), the latter of which was her debut in a leading role.

Filmography

References

External links 
 Yasmin on IMDb

Pakistani people
Pakistani actresses
1935 births